Robert Gale Bishop (June 4, 1922 – December 26, 2003) was an American professional basketball player.

Born in Sumas, Washington, he played collegiately for the Washington State University.

He played for the Philadelphia Warriors (1948–49) in the BAA for 56 games.

Bishop died on December 26, 2003, in Tacoma, Washington.

BAA career statistics

Regular season

Playoffs

External links

1922 births
2003 deaths
All-American college men's basketball players
Amateur Athletic Union men's basketball players
Basketball players from Washington (state)
Forwards (basketball)
People from Sumas, Washington
Philadelphia Warriors players
Washington State Cougars men's basketball players
American men's basketball players